Dangerous Beauty is a 1998 American biographical drama film directed by Marshall Herskovitz and starring Catherine McCormack, Rufus Sewell, and Oliver Platt. Based on the non-fiction book The Honest Courtesan by Margaret Rosenthal, the film is about Veronica Franco, a courtesan in sixteenth-century Venice who becomes a hero to her city, but later becomes the target of an inquisition by the Church for witchcraft. The film features a supporting cast that includes Fred Ward, Naomi Watts, Moira Kelly and Jacqueline Bisset. The film was released as A Destiny of Her Own in some regions, and was retitled The Honest Courtesan for its UK video release.

Plot
Veronica Franco is an adventurous, curious, slightly tomboyish young woman in Venice. Her lover Marco, who will be a Senator like his father, cannot marry her because her family is too poor; he marries a foreign noblewoman instead. Veronica's mother plans for her family's financial security, as she still requires dowries for her younger daughters and money for her son's commission. Rather than go to a convent, Veronica's mother suggests she become a courtesan, a highly paid, cultured prostitute like her mother and grandmother before her. At first Veronica is repelled by the idea, but once she discovers that courtesans are allowed access to libraries and education, she tentatively embraces the idea.

Veronica quickly gains a reputation as a top courtesan, impressing the powerful men of Venice with her beauty, wit, and compassion. Marco finds it difficult to adjust to his new wife, who is nothing like Veronica, and becomes jealous as she takes his friends and relatives as lovers. After Marco's cousin Maffio, a poor bard who was once publicly upstaged by Veronica, attacks her, Marco rushes to her aid. They rekindle their romance, but Veronica refuses to stop seeing clients and accept his support. Nevertheless, she spends a great deal of time with Marco, neglecting her business and ignoring her mother's warnings that such a relationship is dangerous for her.

The Fourth Ottoman–Venetian War (1570–73) breaks out, and the city appeals to France for aid. Veronica is encouraged to seduce the King of France and secures a military alliance. Marco accuses her of enjoying being a courtesan, implying she ought to have rejected the King despite the risk to Venice. Veronica points out that she sacrificed their love for the good of the city, while he only did it to protect his family's political standing, and Marco leaves for war angry. While the Venetians are fighting at sea, a plague hits the city. Religious zealots take the war and plague as punishment for the city's moral degradation, and Veronica's home is quarantined and almost ransacked by a mob.

Veronica is summoned to appear before the Inquisition on charges of witchcraft and refuses to name her clients. When it appears that she will be executed, Marco publicly shames the Venetian ministers and senators into admitting their own adulteries and sins by standing up in the assembly. Bewildered by the extent of sin in the city, the Inquisitor drops the charges of witchcraft, and Marco and Veronica reconcile.

Cast

Reception
The film opened in limited release on 20 February 1998 to mixed but mostly positive reviews, receiving a 69 percent freshness rating on the movie critics website Rotten Tomatoes. Roger Ebert of the Chicago Sun-Times gives it 3 1/2 stars and lauds the writers, noting that "few movies have been so deliberately told from a woman's point of view....Most movies are made by males and show women enthralled by men. This movie knows better." Jack Mathews of the Los Angeles Times described it as "both blessed and cursed with inspiration." In its initial release, Dangerous Beauty played in only 10 theatres, although it did well, earning $105,989 (a per theater average of $10,599 across ten theaters). Dangerous Beauty eventually opened across 313 theaters, but earned only $4.5 million in the United States.

Stage versions
A stage musical version of the film premiered on July 25, 2008 at Northwestern University's Ethel M. Barber Theatre. The musical features book and verse by Jeannine Dominy (the screenwriter of the film), lyrics by Amanda McBroom, and music by Michele Brourman under the direction of Sheryl Kaller. Another musical version of Dangerous Beauty premiered at the Pasadena Playhouse in February 2011, starring Jenny Powers as Veronica Franco and James Snyder (actor) as Marco Venier.

References

External links

 
 Fans of Dangerous Beauty - Facebook Page
 

1998 films
1990s biographical drama films
1998 romantic drama films
20th Century Fox films
American romantic drama films
American biographical drama films
1990s English-language films
Films scored by George Fenton
Films about prostitution in the United States
Films based on biographies
Films directed by Marshall Herskovitz
Films set in the 16th century
Films set in Venice
Regency Enterprises films
Warner Bros. films
Films based on works by Italian writers
Biographical films about poets
Cultural depictions of Italian women
Films produced by Arnon Milchan
1990s American films